Adeline Dieudonné is a Belgian writer. She is best known for her debut novel Real Life (2018), which won numerous literary prizes in the Francophone world, among them:
 Prix du Roman FNAC 
 Prix Rossel
 Prix Renaudot des lycéens
 Prix Goncourt―Le Choix de la Belgique
 Prix des Étoiles du Parisien
 Prix Première Plume
 Prix Filigrane

Dieudonné lives in Brussels where she also performs as a stand-up comedian.

References

Belgian writers
1982 births
Living people
Prix Renaudot des lycéens winners